Tadeusz Wojda (born 29 January 1957) is a Polish prelate of the Catholic Church who has been archbishop of Białystok since 10 June 2017. On 2 March 2021 he was named Archbishop of Gdansk.

Biography
Born on 29 January 1957 in Kowala, Kielce County, Wojda entered the Pallottines in 1976 and was  ordained a priest on 8 May 1983. He received a Licentiate from the Pontifical Gregorian University in 1986, and a PhD in 1989. From 1991, he served in a variety of roles in Congregation for the Evangelization of Peoples. He was appointed the Congregation's under-secretary on 24 July 2012.

On 12 April 2017, Pope Francis named him Archbishop of Białystok. and he was installed there on 10 June 2017.

Within the Episcopal Conference of Poland he is a member of the Mission Committee and the Concordat Commission.

On 7 July 2019, ahead of the LGBT march scheduled to take place on 20 July, Wojda issued a non possumus proclamation to be read in all churches in Białystok and the entire Podlaskie Voivodeship. He called pride marches "blasphemy against God". He described the march as organized "by a foreign initiative in Podlaskie land and community, an area which is deeply rooted in Christianity and concerned about the good of its own society, especially children". Following the march, Wojda condemned the violence that occurred at the march as incompatible with Christianity and urged believers to pray for "the family and its internal purity".

On 2 March 2021 he was appointed archbishop of Gdańsk. He formally installed as Archbishop on 28 March 2021.

References 
 

1957 births
People from Kielce County
Pontifical Gregorian University alumni
Bishops of Białystok
Bishops of Gdańsk
Pallottine bishops
Living people
21st-century Roman Catholic archbishops in Poland